Heritage High School (formerly known as Heritage Community School) is a co-educational secondary school located in Clowne in the English county of Derbyshire.

It held a Mathematics and Computing Specialist college status up until 2015. It is also the fastest growing 11-16 school in Derbyshire. There are currently just over 800 pupils on roll.

The school holds the Careers Mark, a Sport England Award, The Princess Diana Memorial Award and Derbyshire ABC  Award.

The school was in a consortium with The Bolsover School, Shirebrook Academy and Springwell Community College that formed "Aspire Sixth Form", a sixth form provision that operated across all the school sites from September 2014. However, due to lack to students willing to enrol and poor performance, ASPIRE Sixth Form ceased to exist for the 2016-17 A-Level students.

Previously a community school administered by Derbyshire County Council, in April 2017 Heritage High School converted to academy status. The school is now sponsored by The Two Counties Trust.

On 15 July 2019, the school announced it had suffered a ransomware cyber attack, which resulted in wiping of files, electronic data, and the inability to communicate including the use of telephones. The school closed early, resulting in an early end of term.

Notable former pupils
Matthew Lowton, footballer

References

External links
Heritage High School official website

Secondary schools in Derbyshire
Academies in Derbyshire